Heritage Square may refer to:
 Heritage Square (Fayetteville, North Carolina), a place including the Sandford House
 Heritage Square (Golden, Colorado), an amusement park
 Heritage Square, Phoenix, a group of original houses in downtown Phoeni, Arizona
 Heritage Square (Surat, Gujarat), a square in Chowk Bazaar, India
 Heritage Square station, on the Los Angeles County Metro Rail system

See also 
 Heritage Square Museum, a living history and open-air architecture museum in Los Angeles, California
 Penang Heritage Square, a proposed development in Komtar, George Town, Malaysia